John Ochterlony, MA  (1667–1742) was an Anglican clergyman who served in the Scottish Episcopal Church as the Bishop of Brechin from 1731 to 1742.

Biography
He was consecrated a college bishop in the Scottish Episcopal Church on 4 June 1727 at Edinburgh by bishops Freebairn, Cant and Duncan. He was appointed the Bishop of the Diocese of Brechin in December 1731. He died in office in May 1742, aged 75.

References 

 
  

1667 births
1742 deaths
Bishops of Brechin (Episcopalian)
College bishops
18th-century Scottish Episcopalian bishops